Juan Gálvez (died 1507) was a Roman Catholic prelate who served as Bishop of Terracina, Priverno e Sezze (1500–1507).

Biography
Juan Galvez was a native of Seville, Spain. He was born in 1439, in October, probably on the 20th. He was a Doctor in utroque iure, and a protege of Cardinal Oliviero Carafa. He was appointed President of the Apostolic Camera. He was a writer of papal bulls (scriptor apostolicarum bullarum), for whose services substantial fees were due from the intended recipients; he rose to be Master of the Registry of papal bulls.

On 18 December 1500, he was appointed by Pope Alexander VI as Bishop of Terracina, Priverno e Sezze. The right to appoint the bishop of Terracina was reserved to the pope by John XXII and all of his successors. Terracina, moreover, was hierarchically directly dependent upon the Holy See (Papacy). Galvez served as Bishop of Terracina, Priverno e Sezze until his death on (according to David Cheney) 8 August 1507.

According to his tombstone, he died on "viii Id. Aug. MDVII", that is, 6 August 1507.

References

Sources and external links

 (for Chronology of Bishops) 
 (for Chronology of Bishops) 

16th-century Italian Roman Catholic bishops
Bishops appointed by Pope Alexander VI
1507 deaths